Alton Ochsner Sr. (May 4, 1896 – September 24, 1981) was an American surgeon and medical researcher who worked at Tulane University and other New Orleans hospitals before he established The Ochsner Clinic. Now known as Ochsner Medical Center, the clinic is the flagship hospital of Ochsner Health System. Among its many services are heart transplants.

Medical career

Reared in Kimball, South Dakota, Ochsner was an unlikely hero of Southern medicine. He was recruited to Tulane from the University of Wisconsin–Madison. In 1927, he succeeded Rudolph Matas as professor and chairman of the Tulane Department of Surgery. Although Tulane did not have its own hospital at the time, Ochsner succeeded in organizing one of America's premier surgical teaching programs at New Orleans Charity Hospital, an institution that provided invaluable clinical opportunities to Ochsner and his students. Ochsner's refusal to hire a friend of Louisiana governor Huey Long formed part of the background for Long's establishing another medical school, now the LSU Health Sciences Center, across the street from the Tulane University School of Medicine.

As a medical student at Washington University in St. Louis, young Ochsner was summoned to observe lung cancer surgery—something, he was told, that he might never see again. He did not witness another case for seventeen years. Then he observed eight in six months all being smokers who had picked up the habit in World War I.

As a teacher, he became renowned, perhaps notorious to his medical students and residents, for his intense verbal cross-examinations in the Charity Hospital amphitheater, or "bull pen" as it is known. He believed the psychologically taxing ordeal programmed students to perform well under stress and kept them on their toes. At Touro Hospital one of his patients was jazz musician Muggsy Spanier, who credited Ochsner with saving his life and composed the tune "Relaxin' at the Touro" during his recovery.

Ochsner injected his grandchildren with the polio vaccine from Cutter Laboratories, a tragic event which killed his grandson and gave his granddaughter polio.

Ochsner Clinic

The Ochsner Clinic, which he cofounded, was one of the first to document the link between cancer and cigarette use. He pioneered the "war against smoking." His leadership in exposing the hazards of tobacco and its link to lung cancer remain one of his most important contributions. He maintained this association even though he was criticized and ridiculed by his peers. Known today as the Ochsner Medical Center, it is one of the United States's largest group practices and academic medical centers. In 1990 alone, the clinic had 650,000 outpatient visits.

Personal life

In 1948, he was named Rex, King of Carnival. Ochsner was also involved in conservative politics, primarily within the Republican Party.

Ochsner and his wife had four children.

Awards

In 1962, Ochsner received the Golden Plate Award of the American Academy of Achievement.

References

External links
Alton Ochsner Papers at The Historic New Orleans Collection

American surgeons
Tobacco researchers
1896 births
1981 deaths
Louisiana Republicans
People from Brule County, South Dakota
Tulane University faculty
Washington University School of Medicine alumni
20th-century American physicians
Washington University in St. Louis alumni
University of Wisconsin–Madison alumni
20th-century surgeons